Brian G. Coogan is an American politician and a former Democratic member of the Rhode Island House of Representatives who represented District 83 followed by District 64 (after redistricting) from 2000 until January 2005. In the Rhode Island House, he served on the Committee on Corporations. Coogan also served on the East Providence City Council from 2008 to 2010.

Coogan is a native of East Providence. While serving as a State Representative, Coogan was the witness to a bank robbery at an East Providence BankRI. Representative Coogan tailed the bank robber while on the phone with police until the suspect was apprehended.

In 2016, Coogan unsuccessfully sought election once again for District 64 after Helio Melo vacated the seat.

Since leaving state and municipal government, Coogan has transitioned into life in the private sector.

As a real estate investor, Coogan purchased the former Bovi's Tavern property, a former jazz club in East Providence. The area surrounding the former Bovi's, known as Six Corners, is currently under development with Coogan securing commercial, retail, and residential tenants. He rebranded Horton's Seafood, a family-run business into a restaurant serving Mexican fare called The Burrito Bowl.

References

External links
Brian Coogan at Ballotpedia

Place of birth missing (living people)
1970 births
Living people
Democratic Party members of the Rhode Island House of Representatives
People from East Providence, Rhode Island
Politicians in East Providence, Rhode Island